Lauri Arvi Viita (17 December 1916 – 22 December 1965) was a poet hailing from the Pispala district of Tampere, Finland.

Viita was a verbally talented son of a carpenter who became a self-taught writer. He only published four poetry collections, but they  became very popular. He also inspired other writers who had a working-class background. Viita's last creative years were shadowed by a mental illness, and he spent several periods in hospital.

Viita wrote mainly traditional poetry with rhymes. In 1950s, he was shadowed by emerging modernists such as Paavo Haavikko and Tuomas Anhava. He played with words and published e.g. a poem where all words started with letter K.

Viita was married three times and had seven children. His second wife was famous poet Aila Meriluoto. Viita died in a car accident in December 1965, when the taxi he was in was struck by a truck driven by a drunk driver.

Selected works 
 Betonimylläri (poems, 1947) 
 Kukunor (a poetic fairytale, 1949) 
 Moreeni (a novel, 1950) 
 Käppyräinen (poems, 1954) 
 Suutarikin, suuri viisas (poems, 1961) 
 Entäs sitten, Leevi (a novel, 1965)

References

External links
 
 Lauri Viita Museum

1916 births
1965 deaths
People from Tampere
Finnish male poets
20th-century Finnish poets
People with schizophrenia
20th-century male writers
Road incident deaths in Finland